Harry Cordwell (1922-1995) was a British set decorator. He was nominated for two Academy Awards in the category Best Art Direction.

Selected filmography
Cordwell was nominated for two Academy Awards for Best Art Direction:
 Victor/Victoria (1982)
 Empire of the Sun (1987)

References

External links

British set decorators
1922 births
1995 deaths
Emmy Award winners